Hala Orbita is a multi-purpose Indoor arena in Wrocław, Poland. It hosts the home games of Śląsk Wrocław basketball club, Śląsk Wrocław handball club and Gwardia Wrocław men's and women's volleyball clubs. It has a seating capacity for 3,000 people. It is used to host sport events like volleyball, handball, basketball, indoor football, gymnastics, fencing as well as a venue for competitions of martial arts, concerts, artistic events, fairs, exhibitions and congresses.

References

World Games muaythai venues
Śląsk Wrocław
Buildings and structures in Wrocław
Indoor arenas in Poland
Sports venues in Lower Silesian Voivodeship
Basketball venues in Poland
Boxing venues in Poland
Mixed martial arts venues in Poland